Warren or Woodlands Airport, formerly , was located  northwest of Warren, Manitoba, Canada.

References

Defunct airports in Manitoba